Richard Mulvehill was a college football player. Mulvehill was a quarterback for the Georgia Bulldogs, selected for Billy Evans's Southern Honor Roll in  1922.

References

American football quarterbacks
Georgia Bulldogs football players